Mystery to Me is the eighth studio album by British-American rock band Fleetwood Mac, released on 15 October 1973. This was their last album to feature Bob Weston. Most of the songs were penned by guitarist/singer Bob Welch and keyboardist/singer Christine McVie, who were instrumental in steering the band toward the radio-friendly pop rock that would make them successful a few years later.

Mystery to Me sold moderately well, peaking at number 67 on the US Billboard 200 chart dated 22 December 1973. Despite not being a hit single, the song "Hypnotized" became an American FM radio staple for many years. In the wake of the Buckingham/Nicks-led line-up's success a few years later, the album was certified gold by the Recording Industry Association of America (RIAA) in 1976.

Background 
Mystery to Me was Fleetwood Mac's last album recorded in England, the last to have two guitarists in the line-up until Behind the Mask and the last to be co-produced and/or engineered by Martin Birch. As with the preceding Penguin, the group recorded the album at Benifold, their communal house in Hampshire, with the Rolling Stones Mobile Studio. Dave Walker was asked to leave during the sessions and did not feature in any capacity on the final release.

The album's name comes from a line in the chorus of "Emerald Eyes". "Hypnotized" was a minor US radio hit. "Forever" is one of only two Fleetwood Mac tracks to feature Bob Weston as a composer and one of only a small handful to feature John McVie in this capacity. "Keep On Going" was written by Bob Welch, but sung by Christine McVie because Welch decided her voice was better suited to the song than his. This was one of very few occasions when a member of Fleetwood Mac composed a song which was sung by another member. 

"For Your Love" was originally recorded by The Yardbirds, and Fleetwood Mac's cover version replaced a Bob Welch song, "Good Things (Come to Those Who Wait)", on the album at a very late stage in production. Some albums came with a lyric inner sheet and outer sleeve still showing "Good Things" instead of "For Your Love". The song was also released as a single. Although Fleetwood Mac's version of "Good Things" would not see release until 2020, it was later re-recorded by Welch with different lyrics and released as "Don't Wait Too Long" on his solo album Three Hearts. 

Select tunes have been included in subsequent tours. Both "Why" and "Hypnotized" were played on the band's eponymous tour in 1975. "Just Crazy Love" was performed by Christine McVie on her solo tour in 1984. Early shows of the 2018–19 An Evening with Fleetwood Mac tour also featured "Hypnotized".

Bob Welch would rerecord five of his contributions to the album – "Emerald Eyes", "Hypnotized" and "Miles Away" for His Fleetwood Mac Years & Beyond in 2003 and "The City" and "Somebody" for its follow-up volume in 2006 although the latter only featured on the digital edition.

Tour 
During the band's 1973 American tour, they appeared on the Midnight Special, but during the venture, it became clear that Bob Weston was having an affair with Mick Fleetwood's wife Jenny. Although Fleetwood tried to carry on playing with Weston, regardless of the extramarital issues, it soon became clear that something had to give and after a gig in Lincoln, Nebraska, Fleetwood told the McVies and Welch that he could no longer play with Weston in the line-up. John Courage, the band's road manager, fired Weston and put him on a plane back to the UK. With the tour cut short, the band also went back to England to break the news to their manager Clifford Davis, who was so angry that he sent another group of musicians on the road as Fleetwood Mac, claiming that he owned the name.

Commercial performance
Mystery to Me debuted at number 156 on US Billboard 200 chart dated 17 November 1973. The album reached its peak at number 67 on the chart dated 22 December 1973, after being on the chart for six weeks. The album ultimately spent a total of 26 weeks on the chart. On 9 November 1976, the album was certified gold by the Recording Industry Association of America (RIAA) for sales of over 500,000 copies in the United States.

Track listing

Personnel 
Fleetwood Mac
Bob Welch – electric guitar, acoustic guitar, bass guitar on "Keep on Going", lead and backing vocals
Bob Weston – electric guitar, slide guitar, acoustic guitar, backing vocals
Christine McVie – keyboards, lead and backing vocals
John McVie – bass guitar
Mick Fleetwood – drums, percussion

Additional personnel
Richard Hewson – string arrangements

Production
Fleetwood Mac – production
Martin Birch – production, engineer
Desmond Majekodunmi – assistant engineer
Paul Hardiman – assistant engineer
Clive Arrowsmith – photography
Liverpool Art Student – cover design, unpaid
Mixed at Advision Studios, London

Charts

Certification

References 

Fleetwood Mac albums
1973 albums
Albums produced by Martin Birch
Reprise Records albums
Albums produced by John McVie
Albums produced by Mick Fleetwood
Albums produced by Christine McVie
Albums produced by Bob Welch (musician)
Albums recorded in a home studio